Battledown is a private residential estate in Cheltenham, Gloucestershire, England. In the 19th century a number of such private estates were established in the town;  Battledown is the last to remain private, the rest having been merged into the wider town.  Battledown is one of the richest parts of Cheltenham; the average house price is approximately £1 million.
In the 1960s Battledown Manor became a home for boys between the ages of 9 and 16. The head was a retired Royal Marines Captain, J B Ward, and the manor housed some 15 to 20 boys from across England. All of the boys were sent to local schools in Charlton Kings and Cheltenham.

References

External links

Villages in Gloucestershire